Mushroom tea is an infusion of mushrooms in water, made by using edible/medicinal mushrooms (such as lingzhi mushroom) or psychedelic mushrooms (such as Psilocybe cubensis). The active ingredient in psychedelic mushrooms is psilocybin, while the active ingredients in medicinal mushrooms are thought to be beta-glucans.

Korea 

In Korea, mushroom teas known as beoseot-cha are made from edible mushrooms such as black hoof mushroom, lingzhi mushroom, oyster mushroom, scaly hedgehog, and shiitake mushroom.

 Neungi-cha – scaly hedgehog tea
 Neutari-cha – oyster mushroom tea
 Pyogo-cha – shiitake mushroom tea
 Sanghwang-cha – black hoof mushroom tea
 Yeongji-cha – lingzhi mushroom tea

See also
Kombucha (tea mushroom)
Psychedelic mushrooms

References

External links
Erowid Psilocybin Mushroom Vault : Tea Preparation 

Drug culture
Herbal tea
Korean tea